Thomas Wæhler (born 28 July 1973) is a Norwegian football defender who last played for Norwegian team Skeid. He has played professionally with Lyn and Strømsgodset IF, including stints in the Norwegian Premier League in 1992–1993 and 1997–2001.

He is married to retired international footballer Kristine Edner.

References

1973 births
Living people
Norwegian footballers
Lyn Fotball players
Strømsgodset Toppfotball players
Bærum SK players
Expatriate men's footballers in Denmark
Norwegian expatriate footballers

Association football defenders